This article details the 2010–11 UEFA Champions League qualifying phase and play-off round.

There were two paths:
Champions Path, which included all domestic champions which did not automatically qualified for the group stage.
Non-Champions Path (also called the Best-placed Path), which included all non-domestic champions which did not automatically qualified for the group stage.

Each tie is played over two legs, with each team playing one leg at home. The team that has the higher aggregate score over the two legs progresses to the next round. In the event that aggregate scores finish level, the away goals rule is applied, i.e., the team that scored more goals away from home over the two legs progresses. If away goals are also equal, then 30 minutes of extra time are played, divided into two 15-minute halves. The away goals rule is again applied after extra time, i.e., if there are goals scored during extra time and the aggregate score is still level, the visiting team qualifies by virtue of more away goals scored. If no goals are scored during extra time, the tie is decided by penalty shootout.

All times CEST (UTC+2)

Round and draw dates
All draws held at UEFA headquarters in Nyon, Switzerland.

Teams
Below are the 54 teams (39 in Champions Path, 15 in Non-Champions path) that were involved in the qualifying phase and play-off round, grouped by their starting rounds. The 10 winners of the play-off round (5 in Champions Path, 5 in Non-Champions Path) qualified for the group stage to join the 22 automatic qualifiers. The losing teams from the third qualifying round and the play-off round entered the Europa League play-off round and the group stage respectively.

In each round, teams were seeded based on their 2010 UEFA club coefficients. Prior to the draw, UEFA may form "groups" in accordance with the principles set by the Club Competitions Committee, but they are purely for convenience of the draw and do not resemble any real groupings in the sense of the competition, while ensuring that teams from the same association not drawn against each other.

Champions Path

Non-Champions Path

First qualifying round

Seeding

Summary

|}

Notes

Matches

Rudar Pljevlja won 7–1 on aggregate.

Birkirkara won 7–3 on aggregate. The first leg was cancelled and awarded 3–0 to Birkirkara.

Second qualifying round

Seeding

Notes

Matches

|}

First leg

Sparta Prague won 5–0 on aggregate.

Aktobe won 3–1 on aggregate.

Debrecen won 4–3 on aggregate.

Partizan won 4–1 on aggregate.

1–1 on aggregate; Lech Poznań won on penalties.

Dinamo Zagreb won 5–4 on aggregate.

Litex Lovech won 5–0 on aggregate.

Žilina won 3–1 on aggregate.

Sheriff Tiraspol won 3–2 on aggregate.

Hapoel Tel Aviv won 6–0 on aggregate.

Omonia won 5–0 on aggregate.

Red Bull Salzburg won 5–1 on aggregate.

The New Saints won 4–1 on aggregate.

BATE won 6–1 on aggregate.

AIK won 1–0 on aggregate.

Rosenborg won 2–0 on aggregate.

HJK won 2–1 on aggregate.

Third qualifying round

Seeding

Notes

Summary

|+Champions Path

|}

|+Non-Champions Path

|}

Matches

Sparta won 2–0 on aggregate.

Hapoel Tel Aviv won 3–2 on aggregate.

2–2 on aggregate; Sheriff Tiraspol won on penalties.

Žilina won 4–2 on aggregate.

Basel won 5–1 on aggregate.

Rosenborg won 4–0 on aggregate.

Partizan won 5–1 on aggregate.

Anderlecht won 6–1 on aggregate.

Copenhagen won 3–2 on aggregate.

Red Bull Salzburg won 5–2 on aggregate.

4–4 on aggregate; Ajax won on away goals.

Dynamo Kyiv won 6–1 on aggregate.

Young Boys won 3–2 on aggregate.

Braga won 4–2 on aggregate.

Zenit St. Petersburg won 1–0 on aggregate.

Play-off round

Seeding

Summary

|+Champions Path

|}

|+Non-Champions Path

|}

Matches

Hapoel Tel Aviv won 4–3 on aggregate.

2–2 on aggregate; Copenhagen won on away goals.

Basel won 4–0 on aggregate.

Žilina won 3–0 on aggregate.

4–4 on aggregate; Partizan won on penalties.

Tottenham won 6–3 on aggregate.

Braga won 5–3 on aggregate.

Werder Bremen won 5–4 on aggregate.

Auxerre won 2–1 on aggregate.

Ajax won 3–2 on aggregate.

Notes

References

External links

2010–11 UEFA Champions League, UEFA.com

Qualifying rounds
2010-11